Avondale Estate may refer to:
 the Avondale Agricultural Research Station in Western Australia, formerly known as Avondale Estate
 Avondale Estates, Georgia, a city in DeKalb County, Georgia, United States
 Avondale Estate in Cooranbong, New South Wales, Australia
 Avondale Estates in Parkland County, Alberta, Canada